Joseph George Harkness JP (21 July 1850 – 9 January 1930) was a 19th-century independent conservative Member of Parliament from Nelson, New Zealand.

Early life
Harkness, the son of William Harkness, was born and educated at Nelson, attending Richmond School and Nelson College (1867–1868). He became a school teacher for a time.

Harkness dairy farmed in Taranaki and helped organise the dairying industry. He was largely responsible for the co-operative dairy factory company's takeover of the Motorua Freezing Works, New Plymouth. Harkness also helped build up of the National Dairy Association, of which he was its President, secretary, and manager. He secretary of the Dairy Producers Freezing Company from about 1919 to 1929 when he retired. From 1929 he resided Te Horo, Taranaki, where he owned a farm.

Political career

The 1887 general election in the Waimea-Picton electorate was contested by Arthur Seymour, Harkness and Charles H. Mills, who received 446, 444 and 415 votes, respectively. Seymour was thus elected. The 1890 general election was contested by Harkness, John Kerr and Francis William Flowerday, who received 672, 655 and 94 votes, respectively.

Civic service
Harkness lived in Khandallah, Wellington for a number of years and was Mayor of the Onslow Borough in 1907. For some 30 years, he took, a prominent part in the business and public life of the City of Wellington, being a member of the Chamber of Commerce for 26 years and its President three times in 1907, 1908, and 1918.

He was a member of the Wellington Harbour Board from February 1908 until his death at Midhirst on 9 January 1930. Initially Harkness was the Chamber of Commerce representative on the Board. When the Harbours Act changed the Board he was elected 1911 to represent the payers of harbour dues on goods for two years. He did not stand for re-election, but was appointed Government representative on the board, and held that position up to the time of his death. He was chairman of the Harbour Board from May 1919 to May 1923. As Board Chair, he was a member of the executive of the Harbours Association, and for a time its president.

Harkness was a convinced Prohibitionist and took an active part in the Temperance movement all his life. He was a prominent member of the Masonic fraternity.

He was survived by his wife, four sons, and two daughters.

References

1850 births
1930 deaths
Members of the New Zealand House of Representatives
People educated at Nelson College
People from Nelson, New Zealand
New Zealand MPs for South Island electorates
Unsuccessful candidates in the 1887 New Zealand general election
Unsuccessful candidates in the 1893 New Zealand general election
Wellington Harbour Board members
19th-century New Zealand politicians
New Zealand Freemasons
New Zealand temperance activists